The Palace at 4 a.m. is a 1932 surrealist sculpture by Alberto Giacometti. It is in the collection of the Museum of Modern Art.

Giacometti said the work relates to "a period of six months passed in the presence of a woman who, concentrating all life in herself, transported my every moment into a state of enchantment. We constructed a fantastical palace in the night—a very fragile palace of matches. At the least false movement, a whole section would collapse. We always began it again."

Literary Influence
William Maxwell in So Long, See You Tomorrow (1980) links the Palace at 4 a. m. to the narrator's house while it is being built. It is mainly a scaffold structure in which he and Cletus climb all over in the evenings. Maxwell uses Giacometti's own description of his inspiration for the piece to convey the freedom and wonder of the boys in this structure.

References

External links
The Palace at 4 a.m. via Museum of Modern Art

1932 sculptures
Sculptures by Alberto Giacometti
Sculptures of the Museum of Modern Art (New York City)
Surrealism